Joriwinnyson Santos dos Anjos Rodrigues (born 15 March 1996), commonly known as Jori or Jory, is a Brazilian footballer who currently plays as a goalkeeper for América Mineiro.

Career statistics

Honours
América Mineiro
Campeonato Brasileiro Série B: 2017

References

External links

1996 births
Living people
People from Governador Valadares
Sportspeople from Minas Gerais
Brazilian footballers
Association football goalkeepers
Campeonato Brasileiro Série A players
Campeonato Brasileiro Série B players
América Futebol Clube (MG) players
Guarani Esporte Clube (MG) players
Coimbra Esporte Clube players